The 1968 British Hard Court Championships was a combined men's and women's tennis tournament played on outdoor clay courts at The West Hants Club in Bournemouth in England. It was the first tournament in the Open Era of tennis. The tournament was held from 22 April to 27 April 1968. Ken Rosewall and Virginia Wade won the first open singles titles while the men's team of Roy Emerson and Rod Laver and the women's team of Christine Truman Janes and Nell Truman won the first open doubles titles.

First tournament of the Open Era
The 1968 British Hard Court Championships (BHCC)  hold the distinction of being the first open era tennis tournament. Prior to this tournament professional players were banned by the International Lawn Tennis Federation (ILTF) from competing in tournaments, including the Grand Slams, which were organized by the ILTF and its national organizations. Although all players, amateurs and professionals, were allowed to compete at the 1968 BHCC the players who were part of the World Championship Tennis (WCT) circuit did not participate. Players from the rival National Tennis League (NTL) did enter and in the men's singles event made up the first six seeds. The tournament started on 22 April at 1:43 p.m. when John Clifton served and won the first point of the open era. Clifton lost his first-round match to Owen Davidson who thus became the first winner of an open era tennis match. Ken Rosewall won the men's singles title, taking home $2,400, while runner-up Rod Laver received $1,200. Their final was suspended in the second set due to rain and was finished the following day. Virginia Wade won the women's singles title, defeating Winnie Shaw in the final, but did not take home the winner's prize of $720 as she was still an amateur at the time of the tournament. She subsequently became the first amateur to win a title in the Open Era. Christine Janes and her sister Nell Truman became the first winners of an open tennis event by winning the women's doubles title. The tournament was considered a success and attracted almost 30,000 visitors. The young British player Mark Cox went down in tennis history by becoming the first amateur player to beat a professional, when he defeated 39-year-old American Pancho Gonzales in five sets in a second-round match that lasted two and a quarter hours.

Finals

Men's singles

 Ken Rosewall defeated  Rod Laver 3–6, 6–2, 6–0, 6–3

Women's singles
 Virginia Wade defeated  Winnie Shaw 6–4, 6–1

Men's doubles
 Roy Emerson /  Rod Laver defeated  Andrés Gimeno /  Pancho Gonzales 8–6, 4–6, 6–3, 6–2

Women's doubles
 Christine Truman Janes /  Nell Truman defeated  Fay Toyne-Moore /  Anette du Plooy 6–4, 6–3

Mixed doubles
 Virginia Wade /  Bob Howe defeated   Fay Toyne-Moore /  Jimmy Moore 6–4, 6–3

See also
 Laver–Rosewall rivalry

References

External links
 International Tennis Federation tournament details
 British Pathé newsreel

Clay court tennis tournaments
British Hard Court Championships
History of tennis
British Hard Court Championships
British Hard Court Championships
British Hard Court Championships